The Yomiuri Open was a professional golf tournament on the Japan Golf Tour. Founded in 1970 as the Wizard Tournament, a 36-hole invitational tournament, it was played at Hashimoto Country Club in Wakayama until 1979 when it moved to Yomiuri Country Club in Hyōgo. With the move, it also became a full 72-hole tour event, having been extended to 54 holes in 1976, and adopted its new name. It remained at Yomiuri every year except for 1996, when it was played at Wakasu Golf Links in Tokyo. In 2007 it merged with the Mizuno Open to form the Gateway to the Open Mizuno Open Yomiuri Classic.

Tournament hosts

Winners

Notes

References

External links
Coverage on the Japan Golf Tour's official site

Former Japan Golf Tour events
Defunct golf tournaments in Japan
Sport in Hyōgo Prefecture
Sport in Wakayama Prefecture
Recurring sporting events established in 1970
Recurring sporting events disestablished in 2006